The Strawberry Roan or Strawberry Roan may refer to:

 Strawberry roan, a horse coat colour
 Strawberry Roan (1933 film), an American western film
 Strawberry Roan, a 1932 novel by A. G. Street
 Strawberry Roan (1945 film), a British drama based on the novel
 The Strawberry Roan, a 1948 American western film